The men's 70 kg tournament in karate at the 2009 World Games was held on July 25 at the National Sun Yat-Sen University Gymnasium.

Medalists

Round robin

Group A

Group B

Knock-out stage

External links
 2009 World Games Info system

Men's kumite 70 kg